This is a list of animated television series, made-for-television films, direct-to-video films, theatrical short subjects, and feature films produced by Hanna-Barbera Productions (also known as H-B Enterprises, H-B Enterprise Production Company, and Hanna-Barbera Cartoons). This list does not include the animated theatrical shorts William Hanna and Joseph Barbera produced while employed by MGM. Note that some shows or new spin-offs of shows may be listed twice. Hanna-Barbera won eight Emmy Awards. In 2001, Warner Bros. Animation took over function of Hanna-Barbera following the death of William Hanna.

For subsequent productions featuring Hanna-Barbera created characters, see Cartoon Network Studios and Warner Bros. Animation.

 Key for below:  = Won the Emmy Award

Television Series

Telefilms and TV specials

The ABC Saturday Superstar Movie
Hanna-Barbera produced the following television movies for The ABC Saturday Superstar Movie:

ABC Afterschool Specials 
Hanna-Barbera produced the following television movies / specials for the ABC Afterschool Special series:

Famous Classic Tales 
Hanna-Barbera's Australian division produced the following CBS television specials for the Famous Classic Tales series:

ABC Weekend Specials 
Hanna-Barbera and Hanna-Barbera's Australian division produced the following television movies / specials for the ABC Weekend Special series:

Hanna-Barbera Superstars 10 
Hanna-Barbera Superstars 10 was a series of 10 syndicated telefilms made from 1987 to 1988 in conjunction with Worldvision Enterprises, featuring some of the most popular Hanna-Barbera characters in feature-length adventures. All 10 films are available on VHS and DVD.

The Flintstones Primetime Specials 
Hanna-Barbera produced the following NBC television specials as part of The Flintstone Primetime Specials, the penultimate Hanna-Barbera production overall to contain a laugh track and also the final Hanna-Barbera production overall to contain one produced by the studio, a limited-run prime-time revival of The Flintstones:

The Smurfs primetime specials 
Hanna-Barbera also produced the following NBC prime-time television specials based on The Smurfs:

Other animated specials and telefilms 
Hanna-Barbera also produced the following specials:

Live-action television films and specials

Direct-to-video films

Scooby-Doo 
Hanna-Barbera was credited as the sole production company behind the first four films. Despite being in-name only after 2001, the 1960s–1970s production logo from Hanna-Barbera was still used for the next Scooby-Doo direct-to-video films after Scooby-Doo and the Cyber Chase until Scooby-Doo! and the Samurai Sword. The first, third and fourth films were dedicated to Don Messick, Mary Kay Bergman and William Hanna respectively.

The Greatest Adventure: Stories from the Bible 
The Greatest Adventure: Stories from the Bible was an animated film series about three young adventurers – Derek, Margo and Moki – who travel back in time to watch biblical events take place. 13 videocassettes were released between 1985 and 1992.

Timeless Tales from Hallmark 
Timeless Tales from Hallmark (co-produced with Hallmark Cards) was a live-action/animated film series hosted by Olivia Newton-John who introduced each tale followed by an environmental message. Eight videocassettes were released between 1990 and 1991.

Other direct-to-video films 
Hanna-Barbera received an in-name only credit, with the 1970s production logo being used for the following films.

Theatrical shorts series

Theatrical feature films 

Note: The Hanna-Barbera Feature division was spun into Turner Feature Animation after the company was bought out by Ted Turner.

Warner Bros. announced plans for a Hanna-Barbera cinematic universe at CinemaCon 2016, with Scoob! as its starting point.

Other works

Commercials

Titles and sequences 

Recruitment and Industrial films

Educational films

Television shorts

Theme park rides 

A section of Wonderland Sydney was titled Hannah Barbera Land and featured rides and facilities based on cartoon characters.

Hanna-Barbera Classics Collection 
The Hanna-Barbera Classics Collection (once called the Hanna-Barbera Golden Collection, later called the Hanna-Barbera Diamond Collection) is a series of two-to-four-disc DVD box sets from Warner Home Video and later by Warner Archive, usually containing complete seasons and complete series of various classic Hanna-Barbera (with MGM Cartoons and Ruby-Spears) cartoons (along with the television movies and specials). The line began in March 2004.

Warner Home Video releases

2004 
 The Flintstones: The Complete First Season (March 16, 2004)
 Scooby-Doo, Where Are You!: The Complete First and Second Seasons (March 16, 2004)
 The Jetsons: The Complete First Season (May 11, 2004)
 Jonny Quest: The Complete First Season (May 11, 2004)
 Wacky Races: The Complete Series (October 19, 2004)
 The Flintstones: The Complete Second Season (December 7, 2004)
 Top Cat: The Complete Series (December 7, 2004)

2005 
 The Flintstones: The Complete Third Season (March 22, 2005)
 The Best of the New Scooby-Doo Movies (March 22, 2005)
 Dastardly and Muttley in Their Flying Machines:  The Complete Series (May 10, 2005)
 The Perils of Penelope Pitstop: The Complete Series (May 10, 2005)
 The Flintstones: The Complete Fourth Season (November 15, 2005)
 The Huckleberry Hound Show: Volume 1 (November 15, 2005)
 The Yogi Bear Show: The Complete Series (November 15, 2005)

2006 
 The Flintstones: The Complete Fifth Season (March 7, 2006)
 The Scooby-Doo/Dynomutt Hour: The Complete Series (March 7, 2006)
 Magilla Gorilla: The Complete Series (August 15, 2006)
 Hong Kong Phooey: The Complete Series (August 15, 2006)
 The Flintstones: The Complete Sixth Season (September 5, 2006)

2007 
 Scooby-Doo, Where Are You!: The Complete Third Season (April 10, 2007)
 Wait Till Your Father Gets Home: The Complete First Season (June 5, 2007)
 Space Ghost and Dino Boy: The Complete Series (July 17, 2007)
 Birdman and the Galaxy Trio: The Complete Series (July 17, 2007)
 Josie and the Pussycats: The Complete Series (September 18, 2007)

2008 
 The Smurfs: Season One, Volume 1 (February 26, 2008)
 The Pebbles and Bamm-Bamm Show: The Complete Series (March 18, 2008)
 The Richie Rich/Scooby-Doo Show: Volume 1 (May 20, 2008)
 The Smurfs: Season One, Volume 2 (October 7, 2008)

2009 
 The Real Adventures of Jonny Quest: Season 1, Volume 1 (February 17, 2009)
 The Jetsons: Season 2, Volume 1 (June 2, 2009)

Warner Archive releases

2009 
 Yogi's First Christmas (November 17, 2009) (TV movie)

2010 
 The 13 Ghosts of Scooby-Doo: The Complete Series (June 29, 2010)
 The Pirates of Dark Water: The Complete Series (August 31, 2010)
 Josie and the Pussycats in Outer Space: The Complete Series (October 19, 2010)
 The Addams Family: The Complete Series (October 19, 2010)
 The Funky Phantom: The Complete Series (October 26, 2010)
 Goober and the Ghost Chasers: The Complete Series (October 26, 2010) 
 The Dukes: The Complete Series (December 7, 2010)
 Yogi and the Invasion of the Space Bears (December 7, 2010) (TV movie)
 Yogi Bear and the Magical Flight of the Spruce Goose (December 7, 2010) (TV movie)
 Yogi's Great Escape (December 7, 2010) (TV movie)
 SWAT Kats: The Radical Squadron: The Complete Series (December 14, 2010)
 Thundarr the Barbarian: The Complete Series (December 17, 2010) (Ruby-Spears)

2011 
 Speed Buggy: The Complete Series (January 11, 2011)
 Wheelie and the Chopper Bunch: The Complete Series (January 25, 2011)
 Jabberjaw: The Complete Series (February 15, 2011)
 The Space Kidettes / Young Samson (March 8, 2011)
 Valley of the Dinosaurs: The Complete Series (March 22, 2011)
 Chuck Norris: Karate Kommandos: The Complete Series (April 1, 2011) (Ruby-Spears)
 Frankenstein Jr. and The Impossibles: The Complete Series (April 26, 2011)
 Mister T: The Complete First Season (May 10, 2011) (Ruby-Spears)
 Challenge of the GoBots: The Original Miniseries (May 17, 2011)
 The Herculoids: The Complete Series (June 14, 2011)
 The Jetsons Meet the Flintstones (June 14, 2011) (TV movie)
 Moby Dick and Mighty Mightor: The Complete Series (July 19, 2011)
 Rockin' with Judy Jetson (August 9, 2011) (TV movie)
 The Good, the Bad, and Huckleberry Hound (August 9, 2011) (TV movie)
 Top Cat and the Beverly Hills Cats (August 9, 2011) (TV movie)
 Jonny Quest vs. The Cyber Insects (August 9, 2011) (TV movie)
 Jonny's Golden Quest (August 9, 2011) (TV movie)
 Dragon's Lair (September 20, 2011) (Ruby-Spears)
 A Flintstone Christmas Collection (September 27, 2011)
 A Flintstone Christmas (TV special)
 A Flintstone Family Christmas (TV special)
 The Jetsons: Season 2, Volume 2 (November 8, 2011)

2012 
 Pac-Man: The Complete First Season (January 31, 2012)
 The Real Adventures of Jonny Quest: Season 1, Volume 2 (March 27, 2012)
 Shazzan: The Complete Series (April 3, 2012)
 Inch High, Private Eye: The Complete Series (April 24, 2012)
 Sealab 2020: The Complete Series (May 22, 2012)
 The Amazing Chan and the Chan Clan: The Complete Series (June 19, 2012)
 Hanna-Barbera Christmas Classics Collection (July 31, 2012)
 The Town Santa Forgot (TV special)
 A Christmas Story (TV special)
 Casper's First Christmas (TV special)
 Sky Commanders: The Complete Animated Series (August 28, 2012)
 The Halloween Tree (August 28, 2012) (TV movie)
 Pac-Man: The Complete Second Season (September 11, 2012)
 Snorks: The Complete First Season (September 25, 2012)
 The Flintstones Prime-Time Specials Collection: Volume 1 (October 9, 2012)
 The Flintstones Meet Rockula and Frankenstone (TV special)
 The Flintstones: Little Big League (TV special)
 The Flintstones Prime-Time Specials Collection: Volume 2 (October 9, 2012)
 The Flintstones' New Neighbors (TV special)
 Fred's Final Fling (TV special)
 Wind-Up Wilma (TV special)
 Jogging Fever (TV special)
 I Yabba-Dabba Do! (October 9, 2012) (TV movie)
 Hollyrock-a-Bye Baby (October 9, 2012) (TV movie)

2013 
 Butch Cassidy and the Sundance Kids: The Complete Series (January 15, 2013)
 The Completely Mental Misadventures of Ed Grimley: The Complete Series (January 29, 2013)
 Yogi's Gang: The Complete Series (February 19, 2013)
 Help!... It's the Hair Bear Bunch!: The Complete Series (March 12, 2013)
 The Roman Holidays: The Complete Series (April 23, 2013)
 Captain Caveman and the Teen Angels: The Complete Series (July 23, 2013)
 Casper's Halloween Special (October 1, 2013) (TV special)
 The Thanksgiving That Almost Wasn't (TV special)
 Space Stars: The Complete Series (October 8, 2013)

2014 
 Jonny Quest: The Complete Eighties Adventures (April 8, 2014)
 Challenge of the GoBots: The Series, Volume 1 (May 6, 2014)
 The Jetsons: Season 3 (May 13, 2014)
 Loopy De Loop: The Complete Collection (September 9, 2014)
 Shirt Tales: The Complete Series (September 16, 2014)
 The Super Globetrotters: The Complete Series (October 28, 2014)

2015 
 Dumb and Dumber: The Complete Series (January 13, 2015)
 Challenge of the GoBots: The Series, Volume 2 (March 10, 2015)
 Snorks: The Complete Second Season (July 7, 2015)
 Centurions: Part 1 (July 21, 2015) (Ruby-Spears)
 Clue Club: The Complete Animated Series (August 11, 2015)
 Hanna-Barbera Specials Collection (September 15, 2015)
 The Last of the Curlews (TV special)
 Oliver and the Artful Dodger (TV special)
 The Adventures of Robin Hoodnik (TV special)
 The Three Musketeers (TV special)
 Cyrano (TV special)
 Jack and the Beanstalk (September 15, 2015) (TV special)
 Atom Ant: The Complete Series (October 6, 2015)
 The Secret Squirrel Show: The Complete Series (November 3, 2015)
 The Real Adventures of Jonny Quest: The Complete Second Season (November 10, 2015)
 Galtar and the Golden Lance: The Complete Series (November 10, 2015)

2016 
 Centurions: Part 2 (March 15, 2016) (Ruby-Spears)
 Devlin: The Complete Series (May 24, 2016)
 The New Adventures of Huckleberry Finn: The Complete Series (June 28, 2016)
 Where's Huddles?: The Complete Series (July 26, 2016)
 The Kwicky Koala Show: The Complete Series (October 11, 2016)
 The Peter Potamus Show: The Complete Series (November 1, 2016)
 Snorks: The Complete Third and Fourth Seasons (December 6, 2016)

2017 
 Top Cat: The Complete Series (January 10, 2017) (re-release)
 Wacky Races: The Complete Series (February 14, 2017) (re-release)
 Monchhichis: The Complete Series (April 18, 2017)
 Dink, the Little Dinosaur: The Complete Series (October 10, 2017) (Ruby-Spears)
 Space Ghost and Dino Boy: The Complete Series (December 5, 2017) (re-release)
 Birdman and the Galaxy Trio: The Complete Series (December 5, 2017) (re-release)

2018 
 Scooby-Doo, Where Are You!: The Complete Series (February 13, 2018)
 The Biskitts: The Complete Series (February 20, 2018)
 2 Stupid Dogs/Super Secret Secret Squirrel: Volume 1 (August 14, 2018)

2019 
 Paw Paws: The Complete Series (April 9, 2019)
 The Best of The New Scooby-Doo Movies: The Lost Episodes (June 4, 2019)
 The New Scooby-Doo Movies: The (Almost) Complete Collection (June 4, 2019)
 Wally Gator: The Complete Series (June 25, 2019)
 Lippy the Lion & Hardy Har Har: The Complete Series (July 9, 2019)
 Tom and Jerry Spotlight Collection: Vol. 1–3 (October 15, 2019)

2020 
 Paddington Bear: The Complete Series (July 31, 2020)
 The Flintstones: 2 Movies and 5 Specials (August 4, 2020)

Hanna-Barbera Diamond Collection

2017 
 The Flintstones: The Complete First Season (May 23, 2017) (re-release)
 The Jetsons: The Complete First Season (May 23, 2017) (re-release)
 Scooby-Doo, Where Are You!: The Complete First and Second Seasons (May 23, 2017) (re-release)
 Dastardly and Muttley in Their Flying Machines: The Complete Series (June 6, 2017) (re-release)
 Hong Kong Phooey: The Complete Series (June 6, 2017) (re-release)
 The Huckleberry Hound Show: Season 1, Volume 1 (June 6, 2017) (re-release)
 Jonny Quest: The Complete First Season (June 6, 2017) (re-release)
 Magilla Gorilla: The Complete Series (June 6, 2017) (re-release)
 The Perils of Penelope Pitstop: The Complete Series (June 6, 2017) (re-release)
 Scooby-Doo, Where Are You!: The Complete Third Season (June 6, 2017) (re-release)
 The Best of The New Scooby-Doo Movies (June 6, 2017) (re-release)
 Top Cat: The Complete Series (June 6, 2017) (re-release)
 Wacky Races: The Complete Series (June 6, 2017) (re-release)
 The Yogi Bear Show: The Complete Series (June 6, 2017) (re-release)
 Josie and the Pussycats: The Complete Series (June 20, 2017) (re-release)
 The Pebbles and Bamm-Bamm Show: The Complete Series (June 20, 2017) (re-release)
 The Smurfs: The First Season (June 20, 2017) (re-release)
 Tom and Jerry Spotlight Collection: Volume 2 (October 3, 2017) (re-release) (MGM cartoons)
 Tom and Jerry Spotlight Collection: Volume 3 (October 3, 2017) (re-release) (MGM cartoons)
 The Flintstones: The Complete Second Season (October 3, 2017) (re-release)
 The Flintstones: The Complete Third Season (October 3, 2017) (re-release)
 The Flintstones: The Complete Fourth Season (October 3, 2017) (re-release)
 The Flintstones: The Complete Fifth Season (October 3, 2017) (re-release)
 The Flintstones: The Complete Sixth Season (October 3, 2017) (re-release)
 The Scooby-Doo/Dynomutt Hour: The Complete Series (October 3, 2017) (re-release)
 The Richie Rich/Scooby-Doo Show: Volume 1 (October 3, 2017) (re-release)
 Hanna-Barbera Diamond Collection 4-Pack (December 5, 2017)

2018 
 The Flintstones: The Complete Series (February 13, 2018) (re-release)

2020 
 The Jetsons: The Complete Series (October 13, 2020)

Blu-ray releases

2019 
 The New Scooby-Doo Movies: The (Almost) Complete Collection (June 4, 2019)
 Jonny Quest: The Complete Series (June 11, 2019)
 Scooby-Doo, Where Are You!: The Complete Series (September 3, 2019)
 The Jetsons: The Complete Original Series (September 10, 2019)

2020 
 The Flintstones: The Complete Series (October 13, 2020)
 Space Ghost & Dino Boy: The Complete Series (October 13, 2020)
 Josie and the Pussycats: The Complete Series (November 3, 2020)

2021 
 Thundarr the Barbarian: The Complete Series (April 6, 2021) (Ruby-Spears)
 Josie and the Pussycats in Outer Space: The Complete Series (April 13, 2021)
 The Herculoids: The Complete Original Series (July 27, 2021)

2022 
 Scooby-Doo, Where Are You!: The Complete Series (March 1, 2022) (re-release)

See also 
 Hanna-Barbera (1957–2001)
 Hanna-Barbera Studios Europe (2021–currently)
 List of Hanna-Barbera characters
 List of films based on Hanna-Barbera cartoons
 Ruby-Spears (1977–1996)
 List of Ruby-Spears productions
 Cartoon Network Studios
 Warner Bros Animation
 Animation in the United States in the television era
 Hanna-Barbera in amusement parks
 Metro-Goldwyn-Mayer cartoon studio
 Tom and Jerry
 Droopy
 Spike and Tyke

References 

 List of works
 List of works
Lists of animation